The 2016 Cincinnati Reds season was the 147th season for the franchise in Major League Baseball, and their 14th at Great American Ball Park in Cincinnati. The Reds attempted to rebound from their 2015 season, but ultimately finished in last place in the National League Central division for a second consecutive year. Their record was 68 wins and 94 losses, just four games better than 2015.

Standings

National League Central

National League Wildcard

Record vs. opponents

Regular season

Most Runs Scored in a game: 13 (4/23 vs. CHC; 8/27 vs. ARI)
Most Runs Allowed in a game: 18 (8/22 vs. LAD)
Longest Winning Streak: 5 games (8/16–8/20; 9/9–9/13)
Longest Losing Streak: 11 games (5/16–5/27)

Regular season highlights
The Reds' bullpen set a record by allowing a run in 23 consecutive games from April 10 to May 5.  The previous record had been 20, set by the 2013 Colorado Rockies.
The Reds gave up their 242nd home run on September 19.  That is the most home runs allowed in a season by a team in Major League history. The 1996 Detroit Tigers held the previous mark with 241 home runs allowed. Prior to this game, Cincinnati had been tied for the high among National League clubs with the Colorado Rockies, who allowed 239 home runs in 2001.

Opening Day Starting Lineup

Home attendance

Highest Home Attendance: 4/4 vs. PHI (43,683)
Lowest Home Attendance: 4/7 vs. PHI (10,784)

Game log

|- style="text-align:center; background:#cfc"
| 1 || April 4 || Phillies || FSO || 6–2 || Ohlendorf (1–0) || Hernandez (0–1) || — || 43,683 || 1–0 ||  ||W1
|- style="text-align:center; background:#cfc"
| 2 || April 6 || Phillies || ESPN2/FSO || 3–2 || Wood (1–0) || Hinojosa (0–1) || — || 21,621 || 2–0 ||  ||W2
|- style="text-align:center; background:#cfc"
| 3 || April 7 || Phillies || FSO || 10–6 || Stephenson (1–0) || Morton (0–1) || — || 10,784|| 3–0 ||  ||W3
|- style="text-align:center; background:#fbb;
| 4 || April 8 || Pirates  || FSO || 5–6 || Vogelsong (1–0) || Hoover (0–1) || Melancon (2) || 17,194|| 3–1 ||  ||L1
|- style="text-align:center; background:#cfc"
| 5 || April 9 || Pirates || FSO || 5–1 || Iglesias (1–0) || Cole (0–1) || — || 22,799 || 4–1 ||  ||W1
|- style="text-align:center; background:#cfc"
| 6 || April 10 || Pirates || FSO || 2–1 || Ohlendorf (2–0) || Caminero (0–1) || — || 27,207 || 5–1 ||  ||W2
|- style="text-align:center; background:#fbb;"
| 7 || April 11 || @ Cubs || FSO || 3–5 || Warren (1–0) || Cingrani (0–1) || Rondón (2) || 40,882 || 5–2 ||  ||L1
|- style="text-align:center; background:#fbb;"
| 8 || April 13 || @ Cubs || FSO || 2–9 || Lackey (2–0) || Simón (0–1) || — || 36,496 || 5–3 ||  ||L2
|- style="text-align:center; background:#fbb;"
| 9 || April 14 || @ Cubs || FSO || 1–8 || Hammel (1–0) || Iglesias (1–1) || — || 34,898 || 5–4 ||  ||L3
|- style="text-align:center; background:#fbb;"
| 10 || April 15 || @ Cardinals || FSO || 3–14 || Martínez (2–0) || Melville (0–1) || — || 44,997 || 5–5 ||  ||L4
|- style="text-align:center; background:#cfc"
| 11 || April 16 || @ Cardinals || FSO || 9–8 || Finnegan (1–0) || Wainwright (0–2) || Hoover (1)|| 44,245 || 6–5 ||  ||W1
|- style="text-align:center; background:#fbb"
| 12 || April 17 || @ Cardinals || FSO || 3–4 || Siegrist (1–0) || Ohlendorf (2–1) || Rosenthal (3)|| 46,268 || 6–6 ||  ||L1
|- style="text-align:center; background:#fbb"
| 13 || April 18 || Rockies || FSO || 1–5 || Lyles (1–1) || Ohlendorf (2–2) || — || 12,777 || 6–7||  ||L2
|- style="text-align:center; background:#cfc"
| 14 || April 19 || Rockies || FSO || 4–3 || Stephenson (2–0) || De La Rosa (1–2) || — || 13,240 || 7–7||  ||W1
|- style="text-align:center; background:#cfc"
| 15 || April 20 || Rockies || MLBN || 6–5 || Ohlendorf (3–2) || Bergman (0–3) || — || 12,989 || 8–7||  ||W2
|- style="text-align:center; background:#fbb"
| 16 || April 21 || Cubs || FSO || 0–16 || Arrieta (4–0) || Finnegan (1–1) || — || 16,497 || 8–8 ||  ||L1
|- style="text-align:center; background:#fbb"
| 17 || April 22 || Cubs || FSO || 1–8 || Lester (2–1) || Moscot (0–1) || — || 25,940 || 8–9 ||  ||L2
|- style="text-align:center; background:#cfc"
| 18 || April 23 || Cubs || FSO || 13–5 || Wood (2–0) || Lackey (3–1) || — || 41,660 || 9–9 ||  ||W1
|- style="text-align:center; background:#fbb"
| 19 || April 24 || Cubs || FSO || 0–9 || Hammel (3–0) || Simón (0–2) || — || 36,220 || 9–10 ||  ||L1
|- style="text-align:center; background:#fbb"
| 20 || April 25 || @ Mets || FSO || 3–5 || Verrett (2–0) || Ramírez (0–1) || Familia (6) || 30,250 || 9–11 ||  ||L2
|- style="text-align:center; background:#fbb"
| 21 || April 26 || @ Mets || FSO/MLBN || 3–4 || Verrett (3–0) || Cingrani (0–2)|| Familia (7) || 26,978 || 9–12 ||  ||L3
|- style="text-align:center; background:#fbb"
| 22 || April 27 || @ Mets || FSO || 2–5 || Harvey (2–3) || Moscot (0–2) || Reed (1) || 31,481 || 9–13 ||  ||L4
|- style="text-align:center; background:#fbb"
| 23 || April 29 || @ Pirates || FSO || 1–4 || Nicasio (3–2) || Straily (0–1) || Melancon (6) || 29,938 || 9–14 ||   ||L5
|- style="text-align:center; background:#fbb"
| 24 || April 30 || @ Pirates || FSO || 1–5 || Liriano (2–1) || Simón (0–3) || Melancon (7) || 34,810 || 9–15 ||  ||L6
|-

|- style="text-align:center; background:#cfc"
| 25 || May 1 || @ Pirates || FSO || 6–5 (11) || Wood (3–0) || Vogelsong (1–1) || — || 28,755 || 10–15 ||  ||W1
|- style="text-align:center; background:#fbb"
| 26 || May 2 || Giants || FSO || 6–9 || Mazzaro (1–0) || Ramirez (0–2) || Casilla (5) || 13,829 || 10–16 ||  ||L1
|- style="text-align:center; background:#fbb"
| 27 || May 3 || Giants || FSO || 1–3 || Samardzija (1–0) || Cotham (0–1) || Casilla (6) || 14,309 || 10–17 ||  ||L2
|- style="text-align:center; background:#cfc"
| 28 || May 4 || Giants || MLBN || 7–4 || Straily (1–1) || Peavy (1–3) || — || 21,333 || 11–17 ||  ||W1
|- style="text-align:center; background:#cfc"
| 29 || May 5 || Brewers || FSO || 9–5 ||Simón (1–3) || Anderson (1–4) || — || 13,088 || 12–17 ||  ||W2
|- style="text-align:center; background:#cfc"
| 30 || May 6 || Brewers || FSO || 5–1 || Adleman (1–0) || Cravy (0–1) || Cingrani (1) || 28,249 || 13–17 ||  ||W3
|- style="text-align:center; background:#fbb"
| 31 || May 7 || Brewers || FSO || 7–13 (10)|| Jeffress (1–0) || Cotham (0–2) || — || 27,567 || 13–18 ||  ||L1
|- style="text-align:center; background:#fbb"
| 32 || May 8 || Brewers || FSO || 4–5 || Capuano (1–0) || Ohlendorf (3–3) || Jeffress (8) || 22,376 || 13–19 ||  ||L2
|- style="text-align:center; background:#cfc"
| 33 || May 9 || Pirates || FSO || 3–2 || Ramírez (1–2) || Niese (3–2) || Cingrani (2) || 12,103 || 14–19 ||  ||W1
|- style="text-align:center; background:#bbb;"
| — || May 10 || Pirates ||colspan=9| Postponed (inclement weather) (Makeup date: September 17)
|- style="text-align:center; background:#fbb"
| 34 || May 11 || Pirates || FSO || 4–5 || Watson (1–0) || Ohlendorf (3–4) || Melancon (10) || 14,464 || 14–20 ||  ||L1
|- style="text-align:center; background:#fbb"
| 35 || May 13 || @ Phillies || FSO || 2–3 || Hellickson (3–2) || Finnegan (1–2) || Gómez (14) || 22,230 || 14–21 ||  ||L2
|- style="text-align:center; background:#fbb"
| 36 || May 14 || @ Phillies || FSO || 3–4 || Nola (3–2) || Adleman (1–1) || Hernandez (1) || 29,535 || 14–22 ||  ||L3
|- style="text-align:center; background:#cfc"
| 37 || May 15 || @ Phillies || FSO || 9–4 || Straily (2–1) || Morgan (1–1)|| Cingrani (3) || 27,869 || 15–22 ||  ||W1
|- style="text-align:center; background:#fbb"
| 38 || May 16 || @ Indians || FSO ||6–14 || Hunter (1–1)|| Lamb (0–1)|| — ||12,184 ||15–23 ||  ||L1
|- style="text-align:center; background:#fbb"
| 39 || May 17 || @ Indians || FSO || 1–13 || Salazar (4–2) || Simón (1–4) || — || 13,095 || 15–24 || || L2
|- style="text-align:center; background:#fbb"
| 40 || May 18 || Indians || FSO || 7–8 (12)|| Allen (1–3) || Sampson (0–1) || Otero (1) || 22,815||  15–25 || || L3
|- style="text-align:center; background:#fbb"
| 41 || May 19 || Indians || FSO || 2–7|| Tomlin (6–0) || Cotham (0–3) || — || 21,173 || 15–26 || || L4
|- style="text-align:center; background:#fbb"
| 42 || May 20 || Mariners || FSO || 3–8 || Iwakuma (2–4) || Wood (3–1) || — || 20,435 || 15–27 ||  || L5
|- style="text-align:center; background:#fbb"
| 43 || May 21 || Mariners || FSO || 0–4 || Hernandez (4–3) || Lamb (0–2) || — || 38,200 || 15–28 ||  || L6
|- style="text-align:center; background:#fbb"
| 44 || May 22 || Mariners || FSO || 4–5 || Miley (5–2) || Simón (1–5) || Cishek (12) || 24,123 || 15–29 ||  || L7
|- style="text-align:center; background:#fbb"
| 45 || May 23 || @ Dodgers || FSO/MLBN || 0–1 || Kershaw (7–1) || Finnegan (1–3) || — || 42,519 || 15–30 ||  || L8
|- style="text-align:center; background:#fbb"
| 46 || May 24 || @ Dodgers || FSO || 2–8 || Bolsinger (1–1) || Wright (0–1) || — || 42,278 || 15–31 ||  || L9
|- style="text-align:center; background:#fbb"
| 47 || May 25 || @ Dodgers || FSO || 1–3 || Kazmir (4–3) || Straily (2–2) || Jansen (14) || 44,855 || 15–32 || || L10
|- style="text-align:center; background:#fbb"
| 48 || May 27 || @ Brewers || FSO || 5–9 || Davies (2–3) || Lamb (0–3) || — || 20,441 || 15–33 || || L11
|- style="text-align:center; background:#cfc"
| 49 || May 28 || @ Brewers || FSO || 7–6 || Wood (4–1) || Jeffress (1–1) || Cingrani (4) || 30,293 || 16–33 || || W1
|- style="text-align:center; background:#fbb"
| 50 || May 29 || @ Brewers || FSO ||| 4–5 || Nelson (5–3) || Finnegan (1–4) || Boyer (1) || 34,901 ||  16–34 || || L1
|- style="text-align:center; background:#cfc"
| 51 || May 30 || @ Rockies || FSO || 11–8 || Straily (3–2) || Bettis (4–4) || Ramirez (1) || 30,608 || 17–34 ||  || W1
|- style="text-align:center; background:#fbb"
| 52 || May 31 || @ Rockies || FSO || 4–17 || Gray (3–2) || Moscot (0–3) || — || 20,448 || 17–35 ||  || L1
|-

|- style="text-align:center; background:#cfc"
| 53 || June 1 || @ Rockies || FSO || 7–2 || Lamb (1–3) || Chatwood (6–4) || — || 23,612 || 18–35 || || W1
|- style="text-align:center; background:#cfc"
| 54 || June 2 || @ Rockies || FSO || 11–4 || Simón (2–5) || Butler (2–3) || — || 28,080 || 19–35 || || W2
|- style="text-align:center; background:#cfc"
| 55 || June 3 || Nationals || FSO || 7–2 || Finnegan (2–4) || Gonzalez (3-4) || — || 27,258 || 20–35 || || W3
|- style="text-align:center; background:#cfc"
| 56 || June 4 || Nationals || FSO || 6–3 || Ohlendorf (4–4) || Rivero (0–2) || Cingrani (5) || 25,365 || 21–35 ||  || W4
|- style="text-align:center; background:#fbb"
| 57 || June 5 || Nationals || FSO || 9–10 || Solis (1–1) || Wright (0–2) || Papelbon (15) || 21,422 || 21–36 ||  || L1
|- style="text-align:center; background:#cfc"
| 58 || June 7 || Cardinals || FSO || 7–6 || Cingrani (1–2) || Siegrist (4–1) || — || 24,182 || 22–36 || || W1
|- style="text-align:center; background:#fbb"
| 59 || June 8 || Cardinals || FSO || 7–12 || Bowman (1–1) || Simón (2–6) || — || 21,376 || 22–37 || || L1
|- style="text-align:center; background:#fbb"
| 60 || June 9 || Cardinals || FSO || 2–3 || Oh (2–0) || Ohlendorf (4–5) || Rosenthal (11) || 24,516 || 22–38 || || L2
|- style="text-align:center; background:#cfc"
| 61 || June 10 || Athletics || FSO || 2–1 || Wood (5–1) || Gray (3–6) || Cingrani (6) || 21,250 || 23–38 || || W1
|- style="text-align:center; background:#cfc"
| 62 || June 11 || Athletics || FSO || 2–1 || Straily (4–2) || Mengden (0–1) || Ohlendorf (1) || 32,034 || 24–38 || || W2
|- style="text-align:center; background:#fbb"
| 63 || June 12 || Athletics || FSO || 1–6 || Rodriguez (4–2) ||  Lamb (1–4) || — || 24,880 || 24–39 || || L1
|- style="text-align:center; background:#cfc"
| 64 || June 13 || @ Braves || FSO || 9–8 || Ohlendorf (5–5) || Vizcaino (1–2) || Cingrani (7) || 13,198 ||  25–39 ||  || W1
|- style="text-align:center; background:#cfc;"
| 65 || June 14 || @ Braves || FSO || 3–1 || Finnegan (3–4) || Teheran (2–7) || Wood (1) || 13,176 || 26–39 ||  || W2
|- style="text-align:center; background:#fbb"
| 66 || June 15 || @ Braves || FSO || 8–9 (13) || Ogando (2–1) || Simón (2–7) || — || 14,953 ||  26–40 ||  || L1
|- style="text-align:center; background:#fbb"
| 67 || June 16 || @ Braves || FSO || 2–7 || Wisler (3–7) || Straily (4–3) || — || 21,885 ||  26–41 ||  || L2
|- style="text-align:center; background:#cfc"
| 68 || June 17 || @ Astros || FSO ||  4–2 (11) || Hoover (1–1) || Neshek (2–1) || Cingrani (8) || 37,560 ||  27–41 ||  || W1
|- style="text-align:center; background:#fbb"
| 69 || June 18 || @ Astros || FSO || 4–5 (11) || Feldman (4–3) || Smith (0–1) || — || 39,111 || 27–42 ||   || L1
|- style="text-align:center; background:#fbb"
| 70 || June 19 || @ Astros || FSO || 0–6 || Fiers (5–3) || Finnegan (3–5) || Devenski (1) || 36,369 || 27–43 ||  || L2
|- style="text-align:center; background:#cfc"
| 71 || June 21 || @ Rangers || FSO || 8–2 || DeSclafani (1–0) || Lewis (6–1) || — || 32,291 || 28–43 ||  || W1
|- style="text-align:center; background:#fbb"
| 72 || June 22 || @ Rangers || FSO || 4–6 || Hamels (8–1) || Straily (4–4) || Dyson (15) || 32,407 || 28–44 ||  || L1
|- style="text-align:center; background:#fbb"
| 73 || June 23 || Padres || FSO || 4–7 || Friedrich (4–2) || Ramirez (1–3) || Rodney (16) || 20,443 ||  28–45 ||  || L2
|- style="text-align:center; background:#fbb"
| 74 || June 24 || Padres || FSO || 4–13 || Rea (4–3) || Reed (0–1) || — || 40,713 || 28–46 ||  || L3
|- style="text-align:center; background:#fbb"
| 75 || June 25 || Padres || FS1 || 0–3 || Pomeranz (7–7) || Finnegan (3–6) || Rodney (17) || 40,871 || 28–47 ||  || L4
|- style="text-align:center; background:#cfc"
| 76 || June 26 || Padres || FSO || 3–0 || DeSclafani (2–0) || Perdomo (2–3) || Cingrani (9) || 40,085 || 29–47 ||  || W1
|- style="text-align:center; background:#fbb"
| 77 || June 27 || Cubs || FSO ||  8–11 || Arrieta (12–2) || Straily (4–5) || — || 31,762 || 29–48 ||   || L1
|- style="text-align:center; background:#fbb"
| 78 || June 28 || Cubs || FSO || 2–7 (15) || Patton (1–0) || Hoover (1–2) || — || 35,999 ||  29–49 ||  || L2
|- style="text-align:center; background:#fbb"
| 79 || June 29 || Cubs || MLBN || 2–9 || Hendricks (5–6) || Reed (0–2) || — || 37,188 || 29–50 ||  || L3
|- style="text-align:center; background:#fbb"
| 80 || June 30 || @ Nationals || FSO || 4–13 || Gonzalez (4–7) || Finnegan (3–7) || — || 29,386 || 29–51 ||  || L4
|-

|- style="text-align:center; background:#fbb"
| 81 || July 1 || @ Nationals || FSO || 2–3 (14) || Petit (3-1) || Ohlendorf (5-6) || — || 27,631 || 29–52 ||  || L5
|- style="text-align:center; background:#cfc"
| 82 || July 2 || @ Nationals || FOX || 9–4 (10) || Smith (1-1) || Solis (1-3) || — || 35,195 || 30–52 ||  || W1
|- style="text-align:center; background:#fbb"
| 83 || July 3 || @ Nationals || FSO || 1–12 || Strasburg (11-0) || Lamb (1-5) || — || 37,328 || 30–53 ||  || L1
|- style="text-align:center; background:#fbb"
| 84 || July 4 || @ Cubs || FSO || 4–10 || Hendricks (7–6) || Reed (0–3) || — || 41,293 || 30–54 ||  || L2
|- style="text-align:center; background:#cfc"
| 85 || July 5 || @ Cubs || FSO || 9–5 || Finnegan (4–7)||Lackey (7–5)||—|| 41,310 ||31–54 ||  || W1
|- style="text-align:center; background:#cfc"
| 86 || July 6 || @ Cubs || || 5–3 || DeSclafani (3–0) || Cahill (1–3) ||Cingrani (10) || 41,262 || 32–54 ||  || W2
|- style="text-align:center; background:#fbb"
| 87 || July 8 || @ Marlins || FSO || 1–3 || Fernandez (11–4) || Straily (4–6) || Ramos (26) || 22,333 ||  32–55 ||  || L1
|- style="text-align:center; background:#fbb"
| 88 || July 9 || @ Marlins || FSO || 2–4 || Conley (6–5) || Lamb (1–6) || Ramos (27) || 23,653 ||  32–56 || ||L2
|- style="text-align:center; background:#fbb"
| 89 || July 10 || @ Marlins || FSO || 3–7 || Dunn (1–1) ||Reed (0–4)  || — || 22,394 ||  32–57 || ||L3
|- style="text-align:center; background:#bbcaff;"
| colspan="12" | 87th All-Star Game in San Diego, California
|- style="text-align:center; background:#cfc"
| 90 || July 15 || Brewers || FSO || 5–4 || DeSclafani (4–0) || Garza (1–3) || Ohlendorf (2) || 30,680 ||  33–57 || ||W1
|- style="text-align:center; background:#fbb"
| 91 || July 16 || Brewers || FSO || 1–9 || Nelson (6–7) || Lamb (1–7)  || — || 31,328 || 33–58 ||  ||L1
|- style="text-align:center; background:#cfc"
| 92 || July 17 || Brewers || FSO || 1–0 || Cingrani (2–2) || Thornburg (3–3) || — || 23,085 || 34–58 ||  ||W1
|- style="text-align:center; background:#cfc"
| 93 || July 18 || Braves || FSO || 8–2 || Finnegan (5–7) || Wisler (4-9) || — || 21,989 ||  35–58 ||  || W2
|- style="text-align:center; background:#fbb"
| 94 || July 19 || Braves || FSO || 4–5 (11) || Cabrera (1–0) || Cingrani (2–3) || — || 23,080 || 35–59 ||  || L1
|- style="text-align:center; background:#cfc"
| 95 || July 20 || Braves || MLBN || 6–3 || DeSclafani (5–0) || Harrell (1–2) || — || 22,091 ||  36–59 ||  || W1
|- style="text-align:center; background:#cfc"
| 96 || July 22 || Diamondbacks || FSO || 6–2 || Straily (5–6) || Bradley (3–6) || — || 24,252 ||  37–59 ||  || W2
|- style="text-align:center; background:#cfc"
| 97 || July 23 || Diamondbacks || FSO || 6–1 || Lorenzen (1–0) || Ray (5–9) || — || 23,963 ||  38–59 ||  || W3
|- style="text-align:center; background:#fbb"
| 98 || July 24 || Diamondbacks || FSO || 8–9 || Godley (3-1) || Finnegan (5-8) || — || 25,304 ||  38–60 ||  || L1
|- style="text-align:center; background:#cfc"
| 99 || July 25 || @ Giants || FSO || 7–5 || DeSclafani (6–0) || Peavy (5-9) || Cingrani (11) || 42,147 ||  39–60 ||  || W1
|- style="text-align:center; background:#fbb"
| 100 || July 26 || @ Giants || FSO || 7–9 || Cain (2–6) || Reed (0–5) || Casilla (22) || 41,896 ||  39–61 ||  || L1
|- style="text-align:center; background:#cfc"
| 101 || July 27 || @ Giants || FSO || 2–1 || Straily (6–6) || Bumgarner (10–6) || Cingrani (12) || 42,079 ||  40–61 ||  || W1
|- style="text-align:center; background:#cfc"
| 102 || July 29 || @ Padres ||  || 6–0 || Finnegan (6–8) || Jackson (1–2) || — || 33,509 ||  41–61 ||  || W2
|- style="text-align:center; background:#fbb"
| 103 || July 30 || @ Padres || FSO || 1–2 || Hand (3–2) || Diaz (0–1) || — || 31,620 ||  41–62 ||  || L1
|- style="text-align:center; background:#cfc"
| 104 || July 31 || @ Padres || FSO || 3–2 || Bailey (1–0) || Clemens (1–2) || Cingrani (13) || 27,346 ||  42–62 ||  || W1
|-

|- style="text-align:center; background:#cfc"
| 105 || August 2 || Cardinals || FS1 || 7–5 || Diaz (1–1) || Oh (2–2) || — || 25,270 || 43–62 ||  || W2
|- style="text-align:center; background:#fbb"
| 106 || August 3 || Cardinals || FSO || 4–5 || Wacha (7–7) || Reed (0–6) || Oh (8) || 20,771 || 43–63 ||  || L1
|- style="text-align:center; background:#cfc"
| 107 || August 4 || Cardinals || || 7–0 || Finnegan (7–8) || Leake (8–9) || — || 21,119 || 44–63 ||  || W1
|- style="text-align:center; background:#fbb"
| 108 || August 5 || @ Pirates || FSO || 2–3 || Watson (2–3) || Ohlendorf (5–7) || — || 28,882 || 44–64 ||  || L1
|- style="text-align:center; background:#fbb"
| 109 || August 6 || @ Pirates || FSO || 3–5 || Nova (8–6) || Bailey (1–1) || Watson (2) || 34,259 || 44–65 ||  || L2
|- style="text-align:center; background:#cfc"
| 110 || August 7 || @ Pirates || FSO || 7–3 || Straily (7–6) || Cole (7–7) || — || 32,947 || 45–65 ||  || W1
|- style="text-align:center; background:#fbb"
| 111 || August 8 || @ Cardinals || FSO || 4–5 || Maness (2–2) || Cingrani (2–4)  || — || 40,616 || 45–66 ||  || L1
|- style="text-align:center; background:#cfc"
| 112 || August 9 || @ Cardinals || FSO || 7–4 || Lorenzen (2–0) || Bowman (1–4) || Iglesias (1) || 40,113 ||  46–66 ||  || W1
|- style="text-align:center; background:#fbb"
| 113 || August 10 || @ Cardinals || FSO || 2–3 || García (9–8) ||  DeSclafani (6–1) || Oh (10) || 40,019 || 46–67 ||  || L1
|- style="text-align:center; background:#cfc"
| 114 || August 12 || @ Brewers || FSO || 7–4 || Bailey (2–1) || Nelson (6–12) || — || 24,553 || 47–67 ||  || W1
|- style="text-align:center; background:#cfc"
| 115 || August 13 || @ Brewers || FSO || 11–5 || Straily (8–6) || Davies (9–5) || — || 30,357 || 48–-67 ||  || W2
|- style="text-align:center; background:#fbb"
| 116 || August 14 || @ Brewers || FSO || 3–7 || Peralta (5–8) ||Reed (0–7) || — || 30,103 || 48-68 ||  || L1
|- style="text-align:center; background:#fbb"
| 117 || August 15 || Marlins || FSO || 3–6 || Phelps (6–6) ||  Finnegan (7–9) || Rodney (21) || 16,918 || 48–69 ||  || L2
|- style="text-align:center; background:#cfc"
| 118 || August 16 || Marlins || FSO || 6–3 || DeSclafani (7–1) || Ureña (1–4) || Cingrani (14) || 14,440 || 49–69 ||  || W1
|- style="text-align:center; background:#cfc"
| 119 || August 17 || Marlins || FSO || 3–2 || Smith (2–1) || Wittgren (3–2) || Cingrani (15) || 13,973 || 50–69 ||  || W2
|- style="text-align:center; background:#cfc"
| 120 || August 18 || Marlins || FSO || 5–4 || Straily (9–6) || Fernandez (12–7) || Iglesias (2) || 14,108 || 51–69 ||  || W3
|- style="text-align:center; background:#cfc"
| 121 || August 19 || Dodgers || FSO || 9–2 || Adleman (2–1) || Norris (6–10) || — || 28,184 || 52–69 ||  || W4
|- style="text-align:center; background:#cfc"
| 122 || August 20 || Dodgers || FSO || 11–1 || Finnegan (8–9) || Anderson (0–2) || — || 29,735 || 53–69 ||  || W5
|- style="text-align:center; background:#fbb"
| 123 || August 21 || Dodgers || FSO || 0–4 || Urías (4–2) || DeSclafani (7–2) || — || 28,752 || 53–70 ||  || L1
|- style="text-align:center; background:#fbb"
| 124 || August 22 || Dodgers || || 9–18 || Chavez (2–2) || Bailey (2–2) || — || 15,690 ||  53–71 ||  || L2
|- style="text-align:center; background:#cfc"
| 125 || August 23 || Rangers || FSO || 3–0 || Straily (10–6) || Holland (5–6) || Cingrani (16) || 16,668 || 54–71 ||  || W1
|- style="text-align:center; background:#fbb"
| 126 || August 24 || Rangers || FSO|| 5–6 || Diekman (4–2) || Wood (5–2) || Dyson (28) || 16,100 || 54–72 ||  || L1
|- style="text-align:center; background:#fbb"
| 127 || August 26 || @ Diamondbacks  || FSO || 3–4 (11) || Escobar (1–2) || Wood (5–3) || — || 26,087 || 54–73 ||  || L2
|- style="text-align:center; background:#cfc"
| 128 || August 27 || @ Diamondbacks || FSO || 13–0 || DeSclafani (8–2) || Godley (4–3) || — || 34,395 || 55–73 ||  || W1
|- style="text-align:center; background:#fbb"
| 129 || August 28 || @ Diamondbacks || FSO || 2–11 || Bradley (5–8) || Bailey (2–3) || — || 22,624|| 55–74 ||  || L1
|- style="text-align:center; background:#fbb"
| 130 || August 29 || @ Angels || || 2–9 || Shoemaker (9–13) || Straily (10–7) || — || 34,161 || 55–75 ||  || L2
|- style="text-align:center; background:#fbb"
| 131 || August 30 || @ Angels || FSO || 2–4 || Weaver (10–11) || Adleman (2–2) || Salas (6) || 33,042 || 55–76 || || L3
|- style="text-align:center; background:#fbb"
| 132 || August 31 || @ Angels || FSO || 0–3 || Nolasco (5–12) || Finnegan (8–10) || — || 34,215 || 55–77 ||  || L4
|-

|- style="text-align:center; background:#cfc"
| 133 || September 2 || Cardinals || FSO ||| 3–2 || Iglesias (2–1) || Oh (4–3) || — || 21,441 || 56–77 ||  || W1
|- style="text-align:center; background:#cfc"
| 134 || September 3 || Cardinals || FSO || 9–1 || Straily (11–7) || Garcia (10–11) || — || 31,118 ||  57–77 ||  || W2
|- style="text-align:center; background:#fbb"
| 135 || September 4 || Cardinals || FSO || 2–5 || Martínez (13–7) || Adleman (2–3) || Oh (15) || 26,985 || 57–78 || || L1
|- style="text-align:center; background:#fbb"
| 136 || September 5 || Mets || FSO || 0–5 || Colón (13–7) || Stephenson (2–1) || — || 18,169 || 57–79 ||  || L2
|- style="text-align:center; background:#fbb"
| 137 || September 6 || Mets || FSO || 3–5 || Smoker (2–0) || Lorenzen (2–1) || Familia (46) || 13,359 || 57–80 ||  || L3
|- style="text-align:center; background:#fbb"
| 138 || September 7 || Mets || || 3–6 || Syndergaard (13–8) || DeSclafani (8–3) || Familia (47) || 13,936 || 57–81 ||  || L4
|- style="text-align:center; background:#fbb"
| 139 || September 8 || @ Pirates || FSO || 1–4 || Nova (12–6) || Straily (11–8) || — || 22,288 || 57–82 ||  || L5
|- style="text-align:center; background:#cfc"
| 140 || September 9 || @ Pirates || FSO || 4–3 || Iglesias (3–1) || Watson (2–5) || — || 24,520||  58–82 ||  || W1
|- style="text-align:center; background:#cfc"
| 141 || September 10 || @ Pirates || FSO || 8–7 || Smith (3–1) || Williams (1–1) || Cingrani (17) || 25,918 || 59–82 ||  || W2
|- style="text-align:center; background:#cfc"
| 142 || September 11 || @ Pirates || || 8–0 || Finnegan (9–10) || Vogelsong (3–5) || — || 26,744 || 60–82 ||  || W3
|- style="text-align:center; background:#cfc"
| 143 || September 12 || Brewers || FSO || 3–0 || Wood (6–3) || Peralta (6–10) || Iglesias (3) || 14,671 || 61–82 ||  || W4
|- style="text-align:center; background:#cfc"
| 144 || September 13 || Brewers || FSO || 6–4 || Straily (12–8) || Garza (5-7) || — || 12,926 || 62–82 ||  || W5
|- style="text-align:center; background:#fbb"
| 145 || September 14 || Brewers || FSO || 0–7 || Guerra (9–3) || Adleman (2–4) || — || 14,368 || 62–83 ||  || L1
|- style="text-align:center; background:#fbb"
| 146 || September 16 || Pirates || FSO || 7–9 (10) || Bastardo (3–0) || Cingrani (2–5) || Watson (13) || 20,238 || 62–84 ||  || L2
|- style="text-align:center; background:#fbb"
| 147 || September 17 || Pirates || FSO || 4–10 || Taillon (4–4) || DeSclafani (8–4) || LeBlanc (2) || 17,226 || 62–85 ||  || L3
|- style="text-align:center; background:#fbb"
| 148 || September 17 || Pirates || FSO || 3–7 || Nicasio (10–6) || Finnegan (9–11) || — || 24,397 || 62–86 ||   || L4
|- style="text-align:center; background:#cfc"
| 149 || September 18 || Pirates || || 7–4 || Straily (13–8)  || Nova (12–7) || — || 19,597 || 63–86 ||   || W1
|- style="text-align:center; background:#fbb"
| 150 || September 19 || @ Cubs || FSO || 2–5 || Hammel (15–9) || Wood (6–4) || Chapman (35) || 39,251 || 63–87 ||  || L1
|- style="text-align:center; background:#fbb"
| 151 || September 20 || @ Cubs || FSO || 1–6 || Lester (18–4) || Smith (3–2) || — || 40,586 || 63–88 ||  || L2
|- style="text-align:center; background:#fbb"
| 152 || September 21 || @ Cubs || FSO || 2–9 || Lackey (10–8) || Stephenson (2–2) || — || 40,434 || 63–89 ||  || L3
|- style="text-align:center; background:#fbb"
| 153 || September 23 || @ Brewers || FSO || 4–5 ||  Suter (2–1) || DeSclafani (8–5) || Thornburg (13) || 35,364 || 63–90 ||  || L4
|- style="text-align:center; background:#cfc"
| 154 || September 24 || @ Brewers || FSO || 6–1 || Straily (14–8) || Jungmann (0–5) || — || 31,398 ||  64–90 ||  || W1
|- style="text-align:center; background:#cfc"
| 155 || September 25 || @ Brewers || || 4–2 || Finnegan (10–11) || Peralta (7–11) || Iglesias (4) || 31,776 ||  65–90 ||  || W2
|- style="text-align:center; background:#cfc"
| 156 || September 26 || @ Cardinals || FSO || 15–2 || Adleman (3–4) || Garcia (10–13) || — || 34,942 || 66–90 ||  || W3
|- style="text-align:center; background:#fbb"
| 157 || September 27 || @ Cardinals || FSO || 5–12 || Wainwright (13–9) || Stephenson (2–3) || — || 34,286 || 66–91 ||  || L1
|- style="text-align:center; background:#cfc"
| 158 || September 28 || @ Cardinals || FSO || 2–1 || DeSclafani (9–5) || Leake (9-12) || Iglesias (5) || 36,275 || 67–91 ||  || W1
|- style="text-align:center; background:#fbb"
| 159 || September 29 || @ Cardinals || FSO || 3–4 || Oh (6–3) || Wood (6–5) || — || 38,830 ||  67–92 ||   || L1
|- style="text-align:center; background:#fbb"
| 160 || September 30 || Cubs || FSO || 3–7 || Buchanan (1-0) || Smith (3–3) || — || 27,368 || 67–93 || || L2
|-

|- style="text-align:center; background:#cfc
| 161 || October 1 || Cubs || FSO || 7–4 || Adleman (4–4) || Lester (19-5) || Iglesias (5) || 30,970 || 68–93 ||  || W1
|- style="text-align:center; background:#fbb"
| 162 || October 2 || Cubs || FSO || 4–7 || Grimm (2–1) || Iglesias (3–2) || Edwards Jr. (2) || 32,587 ||  68–94 ||  || L1
|-

Roster

Player stats

Batting
Updated as of October 2, 2016.
Players in bold are on the active roster as of the 2022 MLB season.

Note: G = Games played; AB = At bats; R = Runs; H = Hits; 2B = Doubles; 3B = Triples; HR = Home runs; RBI = Runs batted in; Avg. = Batting average; OBP = On-base percentage; SLG = Slugging percentage; SB = Stolen bases

Pitching
Updated as of October 2, 2016.
Players in bold are on the active roster as of the 2022 MLB season.

Note: W = Wins; L = Losses; ERA = Earned run average; G = Games pitched; GS = Games started; SV = Saves; IP = Innings pitched; H = Hits allowed; R = Runs allowed; ER = Earned runs allowed; BB = Walks allowed; K = Strikeouts

Farm system

http://www.milb.com/milb/standings/

References

External links

2016 Cincinnati Reds season at Baseball Reference

Cincinnati Reds seasons
Cincinnati Reds
Cincinnati Reds
2010s in Cincinnati